Betty White's Smartest Animals in America is an American television series launched in 2015, that broadcasts on Great American Country. The series was hosted by Betty White.

Production
The series premiered on Betty White's 93rd birthday.

Premise
Ninety-three-year-old entertainer and animal activist Betty White travels America showcasing intelligent animals. The series premiered on January 17, 2015 on cable network Great American Country.

References

External links
 

2010s American reality television series
2010s American comedy television series
English-language television shows
2015 American television series debuts
2015 American television series endings
Great American Country original programming